Piricaudiopsis punicae is a fungus occurring on dead branches of Punica granatum, hence its name. It was first found in a tropical forest in southern China. It differs from other Piricaudiopsis species in conidial morphology and in the proliferation of its conidiogenous cell. The presence or proliferation of the conidiogenous cells and the conidial appendages, as well as the height of its conidia are considered putative phylogenetic characters of this genus.

References

Further reading
Zhang, Kai, et al. "Xiuguozhangia, a new genus of microfungi to accommodate five Piricaudiopsis species." Mycotaxon 128.1 (2014): 131–135.
张凯.中国海南, 云南两省凋落枯枝暗色丝孢真菌分类研究. MS thesis. 山东农业大学, 2009.

External links

MycoBank

Fungal plant pathogens and diseases
Ascomycota enigmatic taxa